A Kind Revolution is the thirteenth studio album by English singer-songwriter Paul Weller, released 12 May 2017. It contains a collaboration with Robert Wyatt in the song "She Moves with the Fayre".

Track listing

Personnel
P.P. Arnold - Backing Vocals (1)
Madeline Bell - Backing Vocals (1)
Boy George - Lead Vocals (8)
Jessica Cox - Strings (4,7,8,10)
Steve Cradock - Acoustic Guitar (6), Electric Guitar (1-3,7), Percussion (7)
Andy Crofts - Electric Guitar (1,3,6,9,10), Bass Guitar (1,2,5,6,8,10), Organ (9), Hammond (2,3,6,7), Philicorda (1,2), Moog (2,8), Mini Moog (5), Backing Vocals (1-10)
Paloma Deike - Strings (3,4,7,8,10)
Ben Gordelier - Drums (1-10), Percussion (1-4,6,7,9,10)
Jan Stan Kybert - Keyboards (1), Programming (5,8)
Josh McClorey - Electric Guitar (8), Lead Guitar (1,2,9), Moog (9)
Steve Pilgrim - Acoustic Guitar (5,8), Backing Vocals (1,2,4,5,8-10)
Charles Rees - Drums (4)
Jon Scott - Trumpet (6)
Amy Stanford - Strings (4,7,8,10)
Laura Stanford - Strings (3,4,7,8,10)
Chris Storr - Trumpet (6)
Phil Veacock - Saxophone (2), Tenor Saxophone (6), Baritone Saxophone (6)
Hannah Weller - Backing Vocals (5)
Paul Weller - Lead Vocals (1-10), Acoustic Guitar (3,6,10), Electric Guitar (1,2,4-10), Bass Guitar (1,3,4,7,9), Piano (1,3-10), Hammond (1,3,5,9), Mellotron (4), Keyboards (5), Synths (7), Harmonium (6), Glockenspiel (9), Backing Vocals (3,5,7-10)
Alistair White - Trombone (6)
Robert Wyatt - Vocals (4), Trumpet (4)

Charts

References

2017 albums
Paul Weller albums
Parlophone albums